Chara baltica is a species of stonewort belonging to the family Characeae.

It is native to Europe.

References

Charophyta